MTV Roadies 9 : Everything or Nothing is the ninth season of MTV Roadies, a reality television show aired on MTV India. The auditions started on 16 September from Pune following with Audition in Kolkata, Delhi, Chandhigarh and Hyderabad.  Part of the season will take place in United States of America. The show started airing on MTV India from 7 January 2012 and every new episode aired on Saturdays at 7 p.m. IST.

The series was won by Vikas Khoker from Chandigarh. He won the title on 30 June 2012 and walked away with a total cash prize of ₹ .

Anirudh Sharma and Diyali Chauhan returned as All-Stars for Roadies X – Battle for Glory. Chauhan finished in 15th place and Sharma placed as 3rd Runner-up.

Post-Selection

After the auditions, the actual format of the show will begin. The show involves various "tasks" which are generally mentally and physically difficult. As the show progresses, the "tasks" become harder for the contestants to complete. There are 3 types of tasks: Money Tasks, Immunity Tasks & Advantage Tasks. At the end of each episode, the contestants vote one contestant out of the show, however it is seen in previous seasons of the show that a previous contestant may return to the show after being voted out. The show's mastermind is Raghu Ram who is well known for adding twists and turns to the journey and making survival in the show very difficult and generate a lot of fights and gives the show a bad name for its murky politics & abuses exchanged.

Destination
MTV Roadies 9 : Everything or Nothing was held halfway in India and the other half continued in US. However, the series's Finale was held in India. As happened in all the past seasons, the Finale included all the Roadies from the season.

Roadies' Selection

Overall Count:

Contestants
There were thirteen contestants overall.

The Total Votes is the number of votes a roadie has received during Vote-outs where the roadie is eligible to be eliminated from the game. It does not include the votes received during the finale where the finalists are voted for the win.

The Journey

Roadies Episode 1 – Jaipur

The, carefully handpicked, Roadies met at the hotel in Jaipur where they got introduced to one another. That evening, they were invited to a party where Rannvijay played host and Agnee performed the Roadies sound track, Manmani, for them. The next day they had to perform a money task against Roadies Battle Ground 4 winner, Hitesh. The task is continued in the next episode.

Roadies – Kanak, Arsh, Anirudh, Vikas, Vinay, Abhishek Shetty, Pratima, Diyali, Taranjeet, Khusbhu, Dimpy, Manali and Himani.
 
Roadies voted out – None
 
Roadies Episode 2 – Jaipur

The Money Task continues in this episode and the Roadies lose to Hitesh. It was then time for the vote out; Raghu makes a surprise entrance and fires Kanak for being underhanded. The Roadies are asked to name 3 people they think can't perform. Those three would not perform in any immunity Task till the Roadies head to America. The Roadies choose Arsh, Pratima and Vikas. They in turn got the chance to choose 3 other Roadies to compete against. They chose Anirudh, Shetty and Diyali.

Roadies – Kanak, Arsh, Anirudh, Vikas, Vinay, Abhishek Shetty, Pratima, Diyali, Taranjeet, Khusbhu, Dimpy, Manali and Himani.
 
Roadies voted out – None
 
Roadies Episode 3 – Jaipur

This episode had the first Immunity Task. Arsh, Vikas and Pratima went head to head with Shetty, Anirudh and Diyali. Arsh, Vikas and Pratima came out victorious which meant that Anirudh, Shetty and Diyali would not take part in any immunity task till USA. The Roadies got called for another Immunity Task which involved a quiz involving general knowledge about the United States of America and the boys failing the task would have to undergo an uncomfortable medical procedure of Enema.

Roadies – Kanak, Anirudh, Vikas, Vinay, Abhishek Shetty, Pratima, Diyali, Taranjeet, Khusbhu, Dimpy, Manali and Himani.
 
Roadies voted out – Arsh
 
Roadies Episode 4 – Delhi

In this episode, the Roadies ride their Hero Karizma's for the first time. Aanchal, The Roadies Season 8 winner, flagged off the journey. The boys performed a Money Task against Sushil Kumar and the girls had to perform a task that involved swimming with an induced handicap, they also had to drink shots of cow urine. The vote out was extremely volatile with betrayal at its very best.
 
Roadies – Anirudh, Vikas, Vinay, Abhishek Shetty, Pratima, Diyali, Taranjeet, Khusbhu, Dimpy, Manali and Himani.
 
Roadies voted out – Kanak
 
Roadies Episode 5 – Delhi

Due to their dismal performance, the Roadies face Raghu and Rajiv who terrify the living daylights out of them. They then have to perform an immunity task where the girls have to lap a track with rucksacks filled with rocks and the boys have to perform a task while lying on a bed of nails. Pratima and Vinay win immunity; there was no vote out in this episode.
 
Roadies – Anirudh, Vikas, Vinay, Abhishek Shetty, Pratima, Diyali, Taranjeet, Khusbhu, Dimpy, Manali and Himani.
 
Roadies Voted Out – None
 
Roadies Episode 6 – Delhi

Dimpy, Vikas and Taranjeet perform a task for immunity, to take them through to the American leg of Roadies journey. The three of them had to cross an Army style obstacle course where Vikas emerged as a clear winner. Vikas won immunity and a ticket to the United States of America. The vote out brings out an unexpected twist where the voted out contestant, Abhishek Shetty attains the power to vote out a contestant of his choice and get back into the show. Anirudh is booted off Roadies!
 
Roadies –Vikas, Vinay, Abhishek Shetty, Pratima, Diyali, Taranjeet, Khusbhu, Dimpy, Manali and Himani.
 
Roadies voted out – Anirudh
 
Roadies Episode 7 – San Francisco

The Roadies make their way to the United States of America. They start their journey in San Francisco where the girls have to perform a Money Task involving Pole dancing. Pratima and Abhishek Shetty are made to sit out of the challenge by the other Roadies. During the final task, the girls perform their versions of pole dancing which turned out to be rather hilarious to watch.

Roadies –Vikas, Vinay, Abhishek Shetty, Pratima, Diyali, Taranjeet, Khusbhu, Manali and Himani.
 
Roadies voted out – Dimpy
 
Roadies Episode 8 – San Francisco

In this episode, the Roadies get another Money Task to perform. This time it's the boys turn to perform, Shetty fails to show his Roadies spirit and disappoints his team. Another money task comes their way where they have to play baseball against a high school baseball player, the Roadies fails miserably and win no money. The vote out gets feisty, with Pratima and Diyali betraying Taranjeet leading to her elimination.

Roadies –Vikas, Vinay, Abhishek Shetty, Pratima, Diyali, Khusbhu, Manali and Himani.
 
Roadies voted out – Taranjeet
 
Roadies Episode 9 – Death Valley

This episode of Roadies 9 gets tougher, the Roadies reach Death Valley. The first task of the episode requires the roadies to split into teams of two and survive a long hike. These teams had a nasty task awaiting them at their next destination wherein they had to eat worms and other rather gross extracts. The vote out had a trust game after which Khusbu was voted out. Raghu pays the Roadies a visit and complicates their lives by bringing back four ex-Roadies.

Roadies –Vikas, Vinay, Abhishek Shetty, Pratima, Diyali, Manali and Himani.
 
Roadies voted out – Khushbu
 
Roadies Returned – Kanak, Arsh, Anirudh and Taranjeet
 
Roadies Episode 10 – Death Valley

The Ex-Roadies make their dramatic return. Although, they aren't given a free pass into the show. The ex Roadies had to take on the current Roadies to secure their place in the show. In the task, Kanak wins and gets straight back into the show. In the vote out, Vikas and Shetty get voted out only for Arsh and Taranjeet to come back into the show.
 
Roadies – Vinay, Pratima, Diyali, Manali
 
Roadies voted out – Vikas, Abhishek Shetty
 
Roadies voted in – Arsh, Taranjeet, Kanak.
 
Roadies Episode 11 – Las Vegas

In this episode, The Roadies reach Las Vegas where the Roadies had to pick a fellow Roadie for a romantic date of sorts. After the date, the boys get waxed as a part of a task. The boys also had to perform a Money Task where they were required to wear flamboyant outfits and perform on the streets of Vegas. Diyali and Taranjeet get into an epic fight which almost leads to Taranjeet quitting the show.

Roadies – Vinay, Pratima, Manali, Arsh, Taranjeet, Kanak and Himani.
 
Roadies voted out – Diyali
 
Roadies Episode 12 – Las Vegas

In this episode the Roadies are in for a treat. They have to perform a Money Task against one of the world's strongest men, Nick, where they fail miserably. Raghu pays the Roadies a visit and gives Arsh a chance to earn money for the Roadies team. He is required to stay up all night as he gets beat by two officers every hour but Arsh fails the task.

Roadies – Vinay, Pratima, Manali, Arsh, Taranjeet, Kanak and Himani.
 
Roadies Voted Out – None
 
Roadies Episode 13 – Las Vegas

In this episode of Roadies, Taranjeet and Pratima and Vinay and Kanak face off in a MMA task to win Immunity. Taranjeet and Kanak win. The episode gets unbelievably dramatic with Pratima suffering a fainting spell due to emotional stress. During the vote out, the newly formed majority votes out Pratima and Manali.

Roadies – Vinay, Arsh, Taranjeet, Kanak and Himani.
 
Roadies voted out – Pratima and Manali
 
Episode 14: Los Angeles

The Roadies wake up to find Vinay kidnapped. Raghu has a special message for them. Kanak, Taranjeet, Arsh and Himani have to dress as Superman, Super Girl, batman and Cat Woman respectively to rescue Vinay. Each of them have to perform a task which leads to Vinay's rescue. After rescuing Vinay, they meet Raghu and Rajiv where the twins rewarded them with Rs. 50,000 each. They, then, gave them an option to choose the 50,000 or Immunity. All of them chose the money. 
 
Roadies: Kanak, Himani, Vinay and Taranjeet, Arsh.
Roadies Voted Out: None.
 
Episode 15:  Los Angeles 

In this episode, the Roadies had to perform the final Immunity Task and a qualifying task. The qualifying Task involved Free Running. Taranjeet clocked the fastest and won the first Karizma ZMR of Roadies 9. Then, they had to perform an Immunity Task. They had to make teams of 2. Kanak and Arsh. Himani and Taranjeet. One team member had to climb a pole while the other had to hang from their legs on another pole. Arsh and Kanak could not perform this task. Himani and Taranjeet performed well. In the Vote Out, all the Roadies voted for Himani to get Immunity as she deserved it. Arsh got voted out. Kanak, Taranjeet, Himani and Vinay advance to the finals.
 
Roadies: Kanak, Himani, Vinay and Taranjeet.
Roadie Voted Out: Arsh.
 
 
Episode 16: Grand Finale

The final episode! One Winner!

The Roadies come together as Raghu and Rannvijay brief them on the first task. Himani and Vinay, Taranjeet and Kanak team up. As a mark of respect for his performance, Vikas gets another chance to qualify for the final task. The first task is to operate a remote controlled car and collect a Roadies log from inside a maze. The catch is that they have to do this upside down using the help of a Laptop. Kanak and Taranjeet lose. Vikas chooses to challenge Vinay and finishes the task faster. Himani and Vikas advance to the finals. The final task is to find a key hidden in a huge slab of ice. To find the key they have to break the slab of ice with a hammer. They are locked inside a cage which is lit on fire. Vikas finds the key faster and emerges as the real ROADIE!
 
Roadies Eliminated in first round: Taranjeet, Kanak, Vinay

Roadie Eliminated in the second round: Himani

Roadie Came Back : Vikas

Winner of roadies 9 everything or nothing: Vikas

The game
Key:
  Task involving both male and female roadies.
  Task where only male roadies were eligible to take part.
  Task where only female roadies were eligible to take part.
  Contestant(s) initially deprived of winning immunity (by garnering highest votes from fellow roadies) but nulled the decision by swapping it with other contestants after the winning challenge against them.
  Contestant(s) deprived of participating in immunity tasks till journey in India.
  Roadie(s) gained entry back into the game and was also awarded immunity in the next vote-out.
  Contestant eliminated.

Voting history

 To vote in two of the Ex-roadies (Arsh, Anirudh or Taranjeet) roadies had to cast a vote against one of the three hopefuls who they would not want back in the competition. With 6 votes out of 8 Anirudh's chance to return diminished. Simultaneously, Arsh and Taranjeet returned to the game.

  Deprived of participating in immunity tasks till the part of journey that'll take place in India.
  Challenged to swap rights of participating in Immunity tasks.
   Granted power of elimination.
  Returned to the competition.
  Voted out.

Roadies' Presence
 Key
  – The Contestant won the Competition
  – Contestant eliminated as a result of losing a task against an opponent
  – Contestant returned as a wild card entry
  – Contestant was voted out of the competition by other roadies
  – Contestant returned as a wild card entry but could not qualify for a place

 Vikas initially came as an audience for the finale but was told to perform as a contender which could result him coming back on the show as a finalist. Vikas challenged Vinay and consequently swapped places with him after winning against him.
 indicates that the Roadie was present in the episode.
 indicates that the Roadie was absent in the episode.
 indicates that the roadies was present in the episode but as a part of the audience for watching the Finale rather than as a contestant for the title.

References

External links 
 MTV Roadies Official Website

MTV Roadies
2012 Indian television seasons